In game theory, trembling hand perfect equilibrium is a type of refinement of a Nash equilibrium that was first proposed by Reinhard Selten. A trembling hand perfect equilibrium is an equilibrium that takes the possibility of off-the-equilibrium play into account by assuming that the players, through a "slip of the hand" or tremble, may choose unintended strategies, albeit with negligible probability.

Definition 

First define a perturbed game.  A perturbed game is a copy of a base game, with the restriction that only totally mixed strategies are allowed to be played.
A totally mixed strategy is a mixed strategy where every strategy (both pure and mixed) is played with non-zero probability.
This is the "trembling hands" of the players; they sometimes play a different strategy, other than the one they intended to play.  Then define a strategy set S (in a base game) as being trembling hand perfect if there is a sequence of perturbed games that converge to the base game in which there is a series of Nash equilibria that converge to S.

Note: All completely mixed Nash equilibria are perfect.

Note 2: The mixed strategy extension of any finite normal-form game has at least one perfect equilibrium.

Example 

However, only  is trembling-hand perfect.

Player 2's expected payoff from playing L is:

Player 2's expected payoff from playing the strategy R is:

Hence  is trembling-hand perfect.

However, similar analysis fails for the strategy profile .

Assume player 2 is playing a mixed strategy . Player 1's expected payoff from playing U is:

Player 1's expected payoff from playing D is:

Equilibria of two-player games 

For 2x2 games, the set of trembling-hand perfect equilibria coincides with the set of equilibria consisting of two undominated strategies. In the example above, we see that the equilibrium <Down,Right> is imperfect, as Left (weakly) dominates Right for Player 2 and Up (weakly) dominates Down for Player 1.

Equilibria of extensive form games 

There are two possible ways of extending the definition of trembling hand perfection to extensive form games.

 One may interpret the extensive form as being merely a concise description of a normal form game and apply the concepts described above to this normal form game. In the resulting perturbed games, every strategy of the extensive-form game must be played with non-zero probability. This leads to the notion of a normal-form trembling hand perfect equilibrium.
 Alternatively, one may recall that trembles are to be interpreted as modelling mistakes made by the players with some negligible probability when the game is played. Such a mistake would most likely consist of a player making another move than the one intended at some point during play. It would hardly consist of the player choosing another strategy than intended, i.e. a wrong plan for playing the entire game.  To capture this, one may define the perturbed game by requiring that every move at every information set is taken with non-zero probability. Limits of equilibria of such perturbed games as the tremble probabilities goes to zero are called extensive-form trembling hand perfect equilibria.

The notions of normal-form and extensive-form trembling hand perfect equilibria are incomparable, i.e., an equilibrium of an extensive-form game may be normal-form trembling hand perfect but not extensive-form trembling hand perfect and vice versa.
As an extreme example of this, Jean-François Mertens has given an example of a two-player extensive form game where no extensive-form trembling hand perfect equilibrium is admissible, i.e., the sets of extensive-form and normal-form trembling hand perfect equilibria for this game are disjoint.

An extensive-form trembling hand perfect equilibrium is also a sequential equilibrium. A normal-form trembling hand perfect equilibrium of an extensive form game may be sequential but is not necessarily so. In fact, a normal-form trembling hand perfect equilibrium does not even have to be subgame perfect.

Problems with perfection 
Myerson (1978) pointed out that perfection is sensitive to the addition of a strictly dominated strategy, and instead proposed another refinement, known as proper equilibrium.

References

Further reading 
 

Game theory equilibrium concepts
Non-cooperative games